Life Under Mike is a political documentary film directed and produced by Canadian filmmaker James Motluk. It was released to theaters in September 2000 to generally positive reviews. The movie takes a critical look at the government of then Ontario Premier Mike Harris. It was partially funded by American filmmaker Michael Moore after Motluk met Moore at the Toronto International Film Festival. Music was provided for the movie soundtrack by rock stars Bruce Springsteen and Bob Dylan. In 2001, it received a Media Human Rights Award from the League for Human Rights of Canada.

The movie touches on themes such as the need for government to play a role in the economy, the need for a strong sense of community, and support for strong trade unions.

It features interviews with economist John Kenneth Galbraith and then Toronto councillor Jack Layton, who later served as leader of the New Democratic Party from 2003 to 2011.

References

External links
 

Canadian documentary films
Documentary films about Canadian politicians
Political history of Ontario
2000 films
2000 documentary films
English-language Canadian films
2000s English-language films
2000s Canadian films